HMS Bruizer was an  which served with the Royal Navy.  She was launched on 27 February 1895 by John Thornycroft at Chiswick, and was sold on 26 May 1914.

Construction and design
On 12 October 1893, the British Admiralty placed an order for three torpedo boat destroyers (and Bruizer) with the shipbuilder Thornycroft under the 1893–1894 shipbuilding programme for the Royal Navy as a follow-on to the two prototype destroyers ( and ) ordered from Thornycroft under the 1892–1893 programme.

As a torpedo boat, the planned armament was a single QF 12 pounder 12 cwt ( calibre) gun on a platform on the ship's conning tower (in practice the platform was also used as the ship's bridge), together with a secondary gun armament of three 6-pounder guns, and two 18 in (450 mm) torpedo tubes. As a gunboat, one of the torpedo tubes could be removed to accommodate a further two six-pounders.

Displacement was  light and  full load. Two funnels were fitted. The ship's complement was originally to be 45 officers and men, but in operation a complement of 53 was prescribed.

Bruizer was laid down at Thornycroft's Chiswick shipyard, as Yard number 299, in April 1894. The ship was launched on 27 February 1895, with the naming ceremony performed by Miss Kathleen Barnaby, the daughter of the S.W. Barnaby the naval architect. She was completed in June 1895.

Service history
Bruizer took part in the 1896 British Naval manoeuvres, and was transferred to the Mediterranean Squadron during that year. She remained in the Mediterranean for several years. Lieutenant Robert Cathcart Kemble Lambert was appointed in command in 1902, and in April that year  she took part in gunnery and tactical exercises. On 19 April 1907 the destroyer  ran aground just outside Grand Harbour, Valletta, Malta. Bruizer rescued the crew of Ariel, all of whom survived.

Bruizer returned to home waters in 1911, serving with the Sixth Destroyer Flotilla in January 1912, and then with a submarine flotilla at Lamlash through to 1913.

She was sold for breaking for scrap to John Cashmore Ltd in 1914.

Notes

References

Publications
 
 
 
 
 
 
 
 
 

 

Ardent-class destroyers
1895 ships
Ships built by John I. Thornycroft & Company